The 1967 All-Ireland Intermediate Hurling Championship was the seventh staging of the All-Ireland hurling championship. The championship ended on 17 September 1967.

Tipperary were the defending champions, however, they were defeated in the provincial championship. London won the title after defeating Cork by 1-9 to 1-5 in the final.

Results

Munster Intermediate Hurling Championship

Final

All-Ireland Intermediate Hurling Championship

Quarter-final

Semi-finals

Final

References

Intermediate
All-Ireland Intermediate Hurling Championship